The 2022 BOOST National was held from October 4 to 9 at the North Bay Memorial Gardens in North Bay, Ontario. It was the first Grand Slam event of the 2022–23 curling season.

Qualification
The top 16 ranked men's and women's teams on the World Curling Federation's world team rankings as of September 5, 2022 qualified for the event. In the event that a team declines their invitation, the next-ranked team on the world team ranking is invited until the field is complete.

Men
Top world team ranking men's teams:
 Brad Gushue
 Niklas Edin
 Bruce Mouat
 Brendan Bottcher
 Joël Retornaz
 Matt Dunstone
 Ross Whyte
 Kevin Koe
 Colton Flasch
 Reid Carruthers
 Yannick Schwaller
 Marco Hösli
 Glenn Howard
 Michael Brunner
 Steffen Walstad
 Korey Dropkin
 Mike McEwen

Women
Top world team ranking women's teams:
 Anna Hasselborg
 Kerri Einarson
 Kaitlyn Lawes
 Satsuki Fujisawa
 Silvana Tirinzoni
 Tracy Fleury
 Kim Eun-jung
 Gim Eun-ji
 Chelsea Carey
 Jennifer Jones
 Isabella Wranå
 Daniela Jentsch
 Tabitha Peterson
 Hollie Duncan
 Krista McCarville
 Raphaela Keiser

Men

Teams
The teams are listed as follows:

Round-robin standings
Final round-robin standings

Round-robin results 
All draw times are listed in Eastern Time (UTC−04:00).

Draw 2
Tuesday, October 4, 11:30 am

Draw 4
Tuesday, October 4, 6:30 pm

Draw 5
Wednesday, October 5, 8:30 am

Draw 7
Wednesday, October 5, 4:00 pm

Draw 9
Thursday, October 6, 8:30 am

Draw 11
Thursday, October 6, 4:00 pm

Draw 14
Friday, October 7, 12:00 pm

Draw 16
Friday, October 7, 8:00 pm

Tiebreaker
Saturday, October 8, 8:00 am

Playoffs

Quarterfinals
Saturday, October 8, 4:00 pm

Semifinals
Saturday, October 8, 8:00 pm

Final
Sunday, October 9, 3:00 pm

Women

Teams
The teams are listed as follows:

Round-robin standings
Final round-robin standings

Round-robin results 
All draw times are listed in Eastern Time (UTC−04:00).

Draw 1
Tuesday, October 4, 8:00 am

Draw 3
Tuesday, October 4, 3:00 pm

Draw 6
Wednesday, October 5, 12:00 pm

Draw 8
Wednesday, October 5, 8:00 pm

Draw 10
Thursday, October 6, 12:00 pm

Draw 12
Thursday, October 6, 8:00 pm

Draw 13
Friday, October 7, 8:30 am

Draw 15
Friday, October 7, 4:00 pm

Tiebreakers
Saturday, October 8, 8:00 am

Playoffs

Quarterfinals
Saturday, October 8, 12:00 pm

Semifinals
Saturday, October 8, 8:00 pm

Final
Sunday, October 9, 11:00 am

Notes

References

External links

October 2022 sports events in Canada
2022 in Canadian curling
Curling in Northern Ontario
2022 in Ontario
2022
Sport in North Bay, Ontario